Propaganda is an Independent music club night spanning across 22 different areas in the UK, Ireland, Australia and Brazil. It is known to be the biggest club night of its kind in the UK in reference to the number of people who attend each week. Propaganda was created by DJ Dan while at Bristol university, claiming there was no alternative club night in the area at that time. The night first started at The Cooler on Park Street in Bristol before it out grew the capacity and had to move to Level Nightclub on Park Row. Propaganda has previously had DJs such as Lily Allen, The Vaccines, The Libertines, Ellie Golding, Rizzle Kicks and Zane Lowe at their events.

Venues and places 
 Aberdeen - Unit 51
 Bath - Moles
 Birmingham - O2 Academy Birmingham
 Bristol - The Fleece
 Cardiff - Clwb Ifor Bach
 Cheltenham - MooMoo
 Cambridge - Fez Club
 Dundee - Church
 Edinburgh - The Liquid Room
 Glasgow - Queen Margaret Union
 Lincoln - Engine Shed
 London - O2 Academy Islington
 Leeds - Propaganda's Attic
 Manchester - 5th Avenue
 Newcastle - Illegitimate 
 Norwich - Waterfront
 Oxford - Purple Turtle
 Reading - Q Club
 Sheffield - Plug
 Sydney - World Bar
 São Paulo - Cine Joia
 Southampton - Junk

Previous guest DJs 
Propaganda is known for having high-profile figures & bands in the music industry to DJ at their nights. Previous guest DJs include Zane Lowe, Lily Allen, Bloc Party, Pendulum & The Pigeon Detectives. Recently guests have included The Vaccines, Greg James and The Libertines.

References

External links 
 

Club nights